1888 in sports describes the year's events in world sport.

Athletics
USA Outdoor Track and Field Championships

American football
College championship
 College football national championship – Yale Bulldogs (coached by Walter Camp)
Events
 Tackling below the waist is legalised.

Association football
England
 FA Cup final – West Bromwich Albion 2–1 Preston North End at The Oval
 Walsall Town and Walsall Swifts merge to form Walsall Football Club. The club initially plays under the name of Walsall Town Swifts.
 Small Heath, later Birmingham City, is the first football club to form a limited company
 7 March — Tinsley Lindley scores in his ninth consecutive England game, a record that still stands.
Origin of the Football League
 One of the problems facing professionalism is the lack of competitive matches, especially for teams that have been knocked out of the FA Cup.  It is self–evident that crowds for friendly fixtures are much lower, which means a reduction in revenue and consequent struggle to pay wages.
 Aston Villa's Scottish director William McGregor seeks a solution by asking other professional clubs to arrange annual home and away fixtures on a competitive basis, with points to be awarded for winning and drawing.  Following a conference between club directors on 23 March, the English Football League is founded on 17 April as one division of twelve clubs.
 The founder members are: Accrington F.C. (1888–1893), Aston Villa, Blackburn Rovers, Bolton Wanderers, Burnley, Derby County, Everton, Notts County, Preston North End, Stoke F.C., West Bromwich Albion and Wolverhampton Wanderers.
Hungary
 MTK Budapest FC was founded.
India
 Durand Cup instituted by Mortimer Durand as recreation for British troops stationed in India. It is the oldest tournament in India and the third oldest in the world.
Scotland
 Scottish Cup Final – Renton 6–1 Cambuslang
 Celtic Football Club is founded by members of the Marist Order, a teaching institute, as a way of raising money for a poor children's charity.  The club's first ground is a piece of rented land not far from the present Celtic Park.  Celtic's first recorded match is a home "friendly" against Rangers; Celtic win 5–2 in what is therefore the inaugural "Old Firm Game".

Baseball
National championship
 National League v. American Association – New York Giants (NL) defeats Saint Louis Cardinals (AA) 6 games to 4.
Events
 The last of many adjustments finally sets four balls and three strikes for a "walk" and a strikeout.

Boxing
Events
 10 March - Heavyweight Boxing champ John L. Sullivan draws Charlie Mitchell in 30 rounds
 30 October - The inaugural World Welterweight Champion is Paddy Duffy of Boston, Massachusetts who is recognised following his 17th-round knockout of Billy McMillan at Fort Foote, Virginia on 30 October.  Duffy retains the title until his death (by tuberculosis) in 1890.  The welterweight division is for fighters weighing between 140 and 147lb.

Lineal world champions
 World Heavyweight Championship – John L. Sullivan
 World Middleweight Championship – Jack Nonpareil Dempsey
 World Welterweight Championship – Paddy Duffy
 World Lightweight Championship – Jack McAuliffe

Cricket
Events
 After a run of disastrous results over a number of seasons, Derbyshire is demoted from first-class status and the 1888 championship is contested by only eight teams: Gloucestershire, Kent, Lancashire, Middlesex, Nottinghamshire, Surrey, Sussex and Yorkshire.  Derbyshire will recover first-class status in 1894 and join the official County Championship in 1895.
 5 July — formation of Glamorgan County Cricket Club at a meeting in the Angel Hotel, Cardiff.
 Thanks mainly to the bowling of Bobby Peel, England defeats Australia 2–1 to retain The Ashes. 
England
 Champion County –  Surrey
 Most runs – W. G. Grace 1,886 @ 32.51 (HS 215)
 Most wickets – Charlie Turner 283 @ 11.68 (BB 9–15) 
 Wisden Six Great Bowlers of the Year – George Lohmann, Johnny Briggs, John Ferris, Charlie Turner, Sammy Woods, Bobby Peel
Australia
 Most runs – Harry Moses 815 @ 62.69 (HS 297*)
 Most wickets – Charlie Turner 106 @ 13.59 (BB 8–39)

Golf
February 22 - “Father of American Golf” John Reid first demonstrates golf on a Yonkers cow pasture to friends

Major tournaments
 British Open – Jack Burns
Other tournaments
 British Amateur – John Ball

Horse racing
England
 Grand National – Playfair
 1,000 Guineas Stakes – Briar-root
 2,000 Guineas Stakes – Ayrshire
 The Derby – Ayrshire
 The Oaks – Seabreeze
 St. Leger Stakes – Seabreeze
Australia
 Melbourne Cup – Mentor
Canada
 Queen's Plate – Harry Cooper
Ireland
 Irish Grand National – The Maroon
 Irish Derby Stakes – Theodolite
USA
 Kentucky Derby – MacBeth II
 Preakness Stakes – Refund
 Belmont Stakes – Sir Dixon

Ice hockey
 March 15 – Montreal Hockey Club defeats Montreal Victorias 2–1 in a playoff to capture the 1888 AHAC championship.

Rowing
The Boat Race
 24 March — Cambridge wins the 45th Oxford and Cambridge Boat Race

Rugby football
Home Nations Championship
 The 1888 Home Nations Championship is the 6th series of the Home Nations Championship contested by Ireland, Scotland and Wales. England is excluded due to its refusal to join the International Rugby Board.  The teams win one match apiece and the title is shared by all three.
Other events
 The 1888 British Isles tour of New Zealand and Australia sees the first overseas touring rugby team from Britain. The tour is a private venture and not authorised by the Home Nations.
 The 1888–1889 New Zealand Native football team are the first overseas rugby tourists from the Southern Hemisphere. The team plays matches under Rugby football, Victorian Rules football and Association football codes.
 Bristol Football Club is formed when the Carlton club merges with rival club Redland Park to create a united Bristol team.

Tennis
England
 Wimbledon Men's Singles Championship – Ernest Renshaw (GB) defeats Herbert Lawford (GB) 6–3 7–5 6–0
 Wimbledon Women's Singles Championship – Lottie Dod (GB) defeats Blanche Bingley Hillyard (GB) 6–3 6–3
USA
 American Men's Singles Championship – Henry Slocum (USA) defeats Howard A. Taylor (USA) 6–4 6–1 6–0
 American Women's Singles Championship – Bertha Townsend (USA) defeats Ellen Hansell (USA) 6–3 6–5

References

 
Sports by year